Laminorului, originally called Laromet is a metro station in northern Bucharest, serving Bucharest Metro Line M4. Although it was supposed to be opened on 19 December 2016 as part of Stage III of M4 line, Metrorex decide it to postpone it until the first half of 2017 due to safety issues. The station was opened on 31 March 2017 as part of the extension of the line from Parc Bazilescu to Straulesti.
It is located at the former tram terminal Laromet on line 20 which was closed because of the metro line's construction.

References

Bucharest Metro stations
Railway stations opened in 2017
2017 establishments in Romania